The following is a Forbes list of Brazilian billionaires based on an annual assessment of wealth and assets compiled and published by Forbes magazine in April 2023, as well as the real time updates from Forbes website.

2022 Brazilian billionaires list

See also
 List of wealthiest families

References

Net Worth
Lists of people by wealth

Brazil economy-related lists